MBLAQ (an acronym for Music Boys Live in Absolute Quality) is a South Korean boy band created by South Korean singer Rain under J. Tune Camp. The group consists of Seungho, G.O, and Mir, and formerly Lee Joon and Thunder. The group debuted on October 15, 2009, at Rain's Legend of Rainism concert.

On October 14, 2009, the group released their debut single album, Just BLAQ, which topped various online and offline music charts in South Korea. The group then released their first extended play album Y on May 19, 2010, and on January 10, 2011, MBLAQ released their first studio album, BLAQ Style.

On December 16, 2014, it was announced Joon and Thunder had departed from the group and they will focus on individual activities for the time being.

History

2009: Just BLAQ 
MBLAQ was first announced on September 21, 2009, with an appearance in Nylon magazine, after having trained for two years. The group appeared alongside Rain, in his Legend of Rainism concert. They performed various songs from their produced EP, Just BLAQ and were met with praise, with many spectators at the concert and fans considering them as the next DBSK. The group released teasers for their debut song, "Oh Yeah" on October 12, 2009 with the music video being released two days later. Coinciding with the music video, MBLAQ's debut single album "Just BLAQ", was released on the same day, topping various charts in South Korea. The next day, the group made their broadcast debut on M.net's M! Countdown with "Oh Yeah".

In early December, the group debuted in Japan, following their performance during Rain's fan meeting. Their performance resulted in a documentary being produced surrounding their stay in Japan. Later that month, the group commenced promotions for their follow up track, "G.O.O.D Luv". Two music videos were released: an 'unofficial' music video prior to the 'official' music video, which was released on December 10, 2009.

In May 2011, Thunder revealed that former member Sang Bae left the group due to his poor health. Thunder also stated that he only joined MBLAQ fifteen days prior to their debut, and that while he sang and rapped live for their performances, his voice is not actually featured on any of the recorded tracks for Just BLAQ due to time constraints.

2010: Y 
On May 17, 2010, the group released their second single album, Y, a track that Rain wrote, composed, produced and choreographed. The music video for the title track, "Y", was released on the same day at midnight with teasers being released from May 6. MBLAQ claimed first place on June 3, 2010, on M! Countdown, and were voted the best Rookie Group for the first half of 2010 through a poll conducted by Korean music site Bugs, obtaining 46% of the votes.

On December 29, 2010, MBLAQ released a teaser music video, featuring their song "Cry", for their upcoming full-length album, BLAQ Style.

On December 30, 2010, J.Tune Entertainment merged with JYP Entertainment. However, as MBLAQ is part of J.Tune Camp, they are not considered as part of JYP Entertainment, or have any ties with the company.

2011: BLAQ Style, Japanese debut, and Mona Lisa 

MBLAQ returned to the music scene in January 2011. MBLAQ participated in the production of BLAQ Style, with Seungho composing and playing the piano for the introductory track "Sad Memories" and Mir writing the rap lyrics for "You're my +".

On January 3, 2011, J.Tune Camp released MBLAQ's music video for "Cry" on YouTube, an R&B track produced by E-Tribe. The video gained more than 500,000 views within a week. J.Tune Camp announced that MBLAQ would be debuting in Japan in May, signing with Sony Music Japan.

On January 10, 2011, MBLAQ released their first studio album, BLAQ Style. After only one day of the album's release, MBLAQ recorded 25,000 orders for BLAQ Style. The next day J.Tune Camp released the full music video for Stay on YouTube, which gained more than 400,000 in a week. On January 13, MBLAQ performed on M! Countdown, followed by performances on the 14th, 15th and 16th at Music Bank, Music Core, and Inkigayo respectively.

MBLAQ were named Artist of the Month by MTV Korea for the month of February. They then released a repackaged version of their studio album, titled BLAQ Style - 3D Edition on February 22, 2011. The album consists of the 13 tracks from BLAQ Style, as well as three new tracks. Two of the three new tracks included MBLAQ's participation in its production. The track "돌아올 수 없는 (Can't Come Back)" was composed by G.O and the lyrics were written by both G.O and Mir, while the song titled "You" was written and composed by Thunder. When it was released, BLAQ Style 3D reached number one on the Hanteo charts. "Again", their last new song from BLAQ Style - 3D Edition, was used to promote The Fighter in South Korea.

BLAQ Style 3D was released in Taiwan as a licensed album on the March 18, 2011, and reached the number one spot from March 18 to 24 on Taiwan's G-Music chart under the K-pop and J-pop category without any promotions.

MBLAQ released their Japanese album on May 4, 2011, with live performances held at Osaka, Sapporo, Nagoya, Fukuoka, and Tokyo. "Your Luv", released on April 19, was ranked first for four consecutive days on Recochoku. MBLAQ were also placed first on the Cellphone Message Music Video chart.

On May 3, MBLAQ kicked off their Japanese promotions with their debut event held at Kanagawa Lazona Kawasaki Plaza, gathering a reported 10,000 fans. They performed "Oh Yeah", "Your Luv" and Daijoubu and more than 4,000 CDs were sold during the event. Your Luv reached second position on the Oricon Daily Charts for May 3, which was before their official Japanese debut and release date. On May 4, Your Luv reached first position on the Oricon Daily Charts, selling more than 11,000 CDs. A week after their debut, MBLAQ reached second position on the Oricon Weekly Charts, selling more than 40,000 copies of Your Luv.

The mini-album Mona Lisa was released online in July 2011. 
On July 14, MBLAQ returned to the stage on Mnet's M! Countdown, followed by performances on the 15th, 16th and 17th at KBS's Music Bank, MBC's Music Core, and SBS's Inkigayo respectively. On July 15, when Mona Lisa was released in stores, it reached number one on the Hanteo Real-time, Daily and Weekly Charts.

On July 15, J.Tune Camp stated that since July 8, Mona Lisa had 30,000 pre-orders, with international fans, in particular Japanese fans, requesting more copies. J.Tune Camp stated they would be producing 50,000 more copies to meet the demand.

In September, MBLAQ reached the number one position on German music website Viva with their "Mona Lisa" music video by garnering 111,000 views. MBLAQ's "Mona Lisa" had topped Bulgaria's Popcore TV chart for sixty eight consecutive days thus far.

The title track, "Baby U", of their new single album was released on October 26, 2011. Baby U! reached number two on the Oricon Daily Chart on its release date, selling more than 22,000 copies. As part of their promotions, MBLAQ travelled to Nagoya, Japan on October 28, Osaka on the 29th, and Tokyo on the 30th to celebrate the release of their new single. On October 30, 1,500 fans were chosen by a lottery among the 12,500 people who gathered at the venue to join the LIVE performance and Great Bingo Tournament. On the final day, 23,000 fans gathered for a special 'High five' event, as well as performances. Baby U! reached number two on the Oricon Weekly Chart, selling a total of 45,624 copies in the first week. The song also reached number one on Japan's Billboard Hot Animation Chart.

2012: 100% Ver., BLAQ Memories, and 1st Asia Tour 
On January 1, 2012, a video teaser for MBLAQ's fourth extended play album was released, including their secondary single, “낙서 (Scribble)”. Strangely however the captions on screen were not of the song's lyrics. In the teaser video, Lee Joon is wrestling with Thunder for a woman, and ultimately points his gun to kill. The video was perceived to be very different from previous MBLAQ videos, as this was the first time the group had produced a full-story music video that incorporated acting and action sequences. The captions were later revealed, in the second music video teaser, to be for their lead single "전쟁이야 (This is War)".

On January 5, MBLAQ released their teaser of “This is War” on their official YouTube channel, J.Tune Camp. The video reveals the 5 members in their ensemble scene, and some small snippets of the full music video. The teaser ends with the members standing center stage with a string orchestra gathered on either side of them, shooting at the audience and finishes with a violent blood splatter that reveals their lead single's name, "전쟁이야 (This is War)". On the same day, the first concept photo was also released by J.Tune Camp. The directors jokingly stated that there was a particular member, Mir, who wanted to shave his hair bald, however they took fans' opinions into consideration and only let the member go as far as a mohawk.

J. Tune Entertainment announced that MBLAQ's fourth mini-album was titled 100% Ver. because "[it] is an expression of MBLAQ's satisfaction and confidence in the album's quality". It has been valuably noted that MBLAQ has expended much effort in the making the album.

Not much has been said by the members about their secondary single, “낙서 (Scribble)”. The group members only said, “You will be able to know about this song by listening to it rather than by us explaining about it”. “Scribble” was released on music portal websites on January 3, 2012. When "Scribble" was released, it reached number one on Soribada and Bugs Music, number three on Mnet's Music chart, and number four on Cyworld Music. "Scribble" was also promoted along with their lead single, "전쟁이야 (This is War)", multiple times on stage as their second single from their 100% Ver.

The full music video of "전쟁이야 (This is War)" was released four days later, on January 10, 2012. Lee Joon reprised his role as the recurring lead image of MBLAQ in the music video as a deadly but warm-hearted assassin. Thunder also appeared as a lead actor in the music video as the assassin's closest friend. Both members' performance in acting, in particular Lee Joon's were positively reviewed by fans and internet browsers alike.

100% Ver. was released on the same day as the music video, containing a total of five songs: "Run", "전쟁이야 (This is War)", “낙서 (Scribble)”, "아찔한 그녀 (She's Breathtaking)", and "Hello My Ex" respectively. It has been revealed that MBLAQ's 100% Ver. had received more than 40,000 pre-orders.
The music video of It's War, reached 1 million views within a week. MBLAQ has won M! Countdown for 2 weeks in a row with This is War.

In early February, Mir shared a picture on his Twitter of G.O working really hard on a new album (BLAQ%Ver.) for MBLAQ. On March 1, MBLAQ started their promotions for Run on M! Countdown, Seungho also injured his back on the pre-recording of M! Countdown, and a video of their dance practice for Run was released online on the same day on J.Tune Camp's original YouTube channel.

On March 7, MBLAQ released a compilation album titled MBLAQ Memories - Best in Korea. The album consists of many songs from their Korean releases, and also includes a Japanese version of You're My +. Upon its release, the album landed at #9 on the Oricon Daily chart

In June, Mir and G.O., as part of MBLAQ's subunit, released a song titled "Wild" for their Asia tour. In July, Thunder released a self-composed solo song titled "Don't Go".

2013: Sexy Beat & Love Beat 
On May 28, a teaser video for  스모키걸 (Smoky Girl), the title track of their comeback album Sexy Beat, was uploaded onto J. Tune Camp's official YouTube channel. MBLAQ previously mentioned in behind the scenes video during a photo shot for Cosmopolitan Korea that they will be returning with the song Smoky Girl, described by member Mir as an addictive song with sexy choreography. Leader Seungho confirms in the video that MBLAQ will be making their comeback in the first week of June. On June 4, the music video for Smoky Girl was released online and MBLAQ held a comeback showcase on the same day as the release of the music video which was streamed live on various websites such as Mnet's Mwave. Sexy Beat, MBLAQ's fifth extended play was also released on June 4, which consists of six tracks with 스모키걸 (Smoky Girl) as their title track.

A repackaged special album titled Love Beat was released two months later on August 12, 2013. It consists of three new tracks: I Don't Know, Prayer (기도) and No Love as their title track, together with all six tracks from Sexy Beat. The music video for No Love was uploaded on J. Tune Camp's official YouTube channel on August 12, showing the photoshoot, composing and preparation for Love Beat.

2014: Broken, Winter, Lee Joon and Thunder's departure 
On March 20, 2014, at 12AM (KST), a teaser video for Be a Man, the title track of their comeback album Broken, was uploaded onto J. Tune Camp's official YouTube channel. On March 24, 2014, the music video of Be a Man was uploaded and the album which consists of seven tracks which the members actively participated in the writing and composing part, was subsequently released online at 12PM (KST). On the same day, MBLAQ also began their comeback promotions for Be a Man by performing at a comeback showcase in WAPOP Hall at 8PM (KST).

On October 13, 2014, it was rumored that Lee Joon and Thunder would be leaving the group after the expiration of their contract with J. Tune Camp. However, J. Tune Camp released an official announcement stating that this was a rumor and that both Joon and Thunder are in talks with the company regarding their future activities.

On November 18, 2014, J. Tune Camp revealed a mysterious image on their official Twitter which showed the date November 25, 2014. It turned out to be the release date of their upcoming album which is made up of self-composed songs.

A few days later on November 20, 2014, J. Tune Camp revealed the track list on their official Twitter and the album which appears to be titled "Winter".

On December 16, 2014, it was announced Joon and Thunder had departed from the group and they will focus on individual activities for the time being; Joon focusing on filming his current drama, MBC's Mr. Back and Thunder studying music for a while.

2015: Mirror 
The group released their eighth mini album Mirror on June 9, 2015, as trio.

Discography

 BLAQ Style (2011)

Music, dance, and influence
Initially debuting as a group more focused on dance and pop, MBLAQ have since experimented with different genres. "Oh Yeah" and "Y" were dance/pop tracks, "My Dream", "Last Luv" and "Rust" are ballad tracks, "Bang Bang Bang" is rock ballad, "Cry" is an R&B track, and "Stay" is a track infused with hip-hop, electronic and rock.

With Rain being their mentor and major influence, he has either written, composed, produced and/or choreographed a few tracks for MBLAQ, including "Oh Yeah", "G.O.O.D Luv", and "Y". For the release of Just BLAQ and Y, MBLAQ focused heavily on their performance with strong choreography. With BLAQ Style, MBLAQ decided to focus more on the music and melody rather than the choreography.

Other activities

2009
In late 2009, MBLAQ's first aired program was Mnet's MBLAQ - The Art of Seduction, which received record ratings.

With their trip to Japan for Rain's fanmeet, music channel Mnet Japan decided to film a documentary of their stay, selecting them as the first stars of their show 2010 K-Pop Star series. The documentary, called Yo! Tokyo, aired in early 2010, showing the public their experience with Japanese culture and traditions over a period of four days.

On December 15, 2009, it was announced that the group would be part of season five of the Idol Show (Hangul: 아이돌 군단의 떴다! 그녀!, lit. Idol Army, She Has Arrived!), with the first episode airing a day later. MBLAQ filmed a total of sixteen episodes.

2010
From February 18, 2010, MBLAQ members G.O and Lee Joon took on the role of co-hosts (MCD Guys) for the music show M! Countdown.

In March, Thunder participated in Mnet's Mnet Scandal. Thunder, having lived in the Philippines, participated in the cable TV show, Mom, I've gone crazy for English with fellow K-Pop singer Nicole from Kara, where he was an English mentor to young children. He was also a host of The M-Wave with fellow artist Krystal from f(x).,.

To coincide with the 2010 FIFA World Cup, MTV Korea created a program called Idol United, where members of male idol groups formed a soccer team to compete against other soccer teams. The fourteen-member team consisted of members from U-KISS, ZE:A, F.Cuz, and The Boss (Dae Guk Nam Ah), with MBLAQ members being Seungho, Lee Joon and Mir.

In addition to his MC role in M! Countdown, Joon also took on the role of MC for QTV's Ranking Women, however he has since left the program to focus on his music activities. He was a permanent member of the TV show Star Golden Bell, which had been replaced by Oh! My School which he also became a permanent member of.

Lee Joon became known as the only Korean Hollywood idol star after starring in Hollywood film "Ninja Assassin" with world star and mentor Rain.

At the end of May, MBLAQ participated in GOMTV's Making the Artist, a small documentary on their life as artists. MBLAQ filmed a total of four episodes documenting their promotions for Y.

Following their promotions for Y, MBLAQ were cast in the final series of Mnet's Celebrities Go to School. Their mentor for the show is actor Kim Su-ro. The show started airing in August 2010.

The members of MBLAQ made an appearance in Lee Joon's drama Housewife Kim Kwang Ja's Third Activities.

2011
In 2011, Thunder was made a permanent cast member of the KBS show Imagination Arcade. Fellow member Lee Joon was a permanent cast member of Oh! My School, the show ended on May 29, 2011.

In March, MBLAQ took part in Mnet Wide's new corner, Refreshing Interview, with their own show called Sesame Player. MBLAQ filmed a total of thirteen episodes, and Infinite had been selected to film Season 2.

In June, it was announced that G.O would replace B2ST's Yoseob in Immortal Songs 2, staying as a cast member for at least a month with new cast members including F.T Island's Hongki, 2PM's Junsu and Secret's Ji Eun.

In August, members Lee Joon and Thunder have collaborated with Chinese artist Vision Wei, and their digital single "Run Away" was released on the 25th.

In September, it was announced the Lee Joon had been cast in the SBS drama Fly Again, which is set to air in early 2012, however, due to scheduling conflicts, he will be replaced by Lee Chun Hee.

In December, Thunder had a cameo role in jTBC drama Padam Padam... The Sound of His and Her Heartbeats where he plays the role Yang Kang Woo, the older brother of Yang Kang Chil (played by Jung Woo-sung).

2012

On January 5, it was announced that MBLAQ would be participating in KBS Joy's Hello Baby Season 5, and new episodes are aired weekly.

On January 26, MBLAQ performed at a special concert MBC Music Era (I Giorni Della Musica) held in Ilsan. The concert consist of live performances by 38 legendary singers. MBLAQ was the only idol group to perform at the concert. MBLAQ sang Mona Lisa with veteran singers Yoon Sang, Kim Gwang Jin, BMK, Kim Kyung Ho and Baek Ji Young singing the chorus. MBLAQ's Lee Joon also joined Kim Jo Han for a live performance of Soul Mates.

On February 10, MBLAQ's Lee Joon & Mir release a digital single Do You Remember with legendary singer Kim Jo Han. The song was written by one of Korea's best composer, Ha Kwang Hoon. A remake from Jo Kwan Woo's hit song Winter Story, which was released in 1995. It was rearranged by producer and songwriter, Shin Jae Hong. During an interview, Kim Jo Han revealed that he preferred MBLAQ over SNSD and the Wonder girls. He had also expressed that he would like to be the 6th member of MBLAQ.

On March 15, it was announced that MBLAQ would be making a cameo on the drama The Strongest K-Pop Survival, which stars member Mir's sister, Go Eun Ah.

On the March 16th, G.O was a special guest on an episode of SBS TV's Salamander Guru and The Shadows. G.O played a stalker and received positive reviews from fans.

In April it was confirmed that Lee Joon would have a role in the KBS2 TV drama I Need a Fairy with fellow idol star Go Woori of Rainbow. Also in April, it was confirmed that G.O was cast in SBS's drama Phantom after impressing one of the producers of Salamander Guru and The Shadows.

In September it was confirmed that Lee Joon would have a role in successful IRIS sequel IRIS 2 it will begin filming in October and will start airing in 2013.

In October, TvN announces that Mir will participate in The Romantic & Idol, a love variety program wherein idol can date each other. Mir also joined the cast of Law of the Jungle 2, he will be the third idol to participate in the show.

In November 2 they participated with to other groups in the Music Bank in Chile.

2013
In January, it was confirmed that Thunder will star in MBC trendy drama Nail Shop Paris as the lead opposite to KARA's Gyuri. The story will revolve around a nail salon wherein flower boy employees work. It was reported that MBLAQ will participate in 64th Sapporo Snow Festival in Japan to promote Korean pop culture, the charity concert will take place on February 9.

In February, G.O was confirmed to have a cameo role in upcoming KBS2 sitcom Remaining Love along with KARA's Seungyeon, ZE:A's Siwan, SECRET's Ji Eun, and INFINITE's Sunggyu.

Concerts/Tours
MBLAQ Concert "Blaq Style" (2011)
MBLAQ Concert "Your Luv" (2011)
MBLAQ Concert "Men in MBLAQ" (2011)
MBLAQ Concert "Hello My A+" (2012)
MBLAQ The 1st Asia Tour "The BLAQ% Tour" (2012)
MBLAQ Concert In Mexico (2013)
MBLAQ Sensation Zepp Tour (2013)
MBLAQ Global Tour Concert "Sensation" (2013)
MBLAQ Concert "MPARTY" (2014)
MBLAQ Concert Summer Vacation In Tokyo (2014)
MBLAQ Concert "Thank You" (2014)
MBLAQ Curtain Call (2014)

Filmography

Reality Show

Awards and nominations

Mnet Asian Music Awards 
The Mnet Asian Music Awards (abbreviated as a MAMA), formerly "M.net KM Music Festival" (MKMF) (1999 - 2008), is a major K-pop music award show that is held by Mnet Media annually in South Korea. Daesang Award (Grand Prize) is equivalent Artist of the Year.

Mnet 20's Choice Awards 
Mnet 20's Choice Awards is presented by South Korean cable television channel Mnet.

|-
| 2012
| MBLAQ
| 20's Performance
|

Other awards

Notes

References

External links 

 
K-pop music groups
J. Tune Entertainment artists
Japanese-language singers of South Korea
Musical groups established in 2009
Musical quintets
South Korean boy bands
South Korean dance music groups
Gr8! Records artists